The track spacing is the distance between the track centres of double-track railway lines. There are standard distances derived from the standard loading gauge in a country. For high-speed trains and in tighter curves that distance needs to be increased.

The track spacing is also called the center-to-center spacing to differentiate it from the edge-to-center spacing of a railway. These two values may be different depending on how signal masts are added to the overall track geometry.

Description 

The distance between the track centres makes a difference in cost and performance of a double-track line. The track centres can be as narrow and as cheap as possible, but maintenance must be done on the side. Signals for bi-directional working cannot be mounted between the tracks so must be mounted on the 'wrong' side of the line or on expensive signal bridges. Track centres are usually wider on high-speed lines, as pressure waves knock each other as high-speed trains pass.

The minimum track spacing can be derived from the loading gauge. The European Berne Gauge has a width of 3,150 mm. The minimal distance to structures on the side of the track is half of it but that is doubled again for double track lines. As the wagon can move within the rail gauge one adds 100 mm and with a possible displacement of tracks over time one adds some 250 mm as a security margin. This leads to a minim centre-to-center spacing of 3,500 mm. In fact, the first Prussian railways were built to that standard but it became soon apparent that it was too dangerous with some passengers having a hand or their head out of the window.

Narrow track centres might be  or less. Narrow track centres may have to be widened on sharp curves to allow for long rail vehicles following the arc of the curve, and this increases a surveyor's workload.

In the United Kingdom, the early lines of the Great Western Railway were built to Brunel's broad gauge, which was also associated with a more generous loading gauge. This is still apparent along those lines which remain in use today: structures such as bridges and tunnels are larger, and the distances between opposite platform faces are larger.

Very wide centres at major bridges can have military value. It also makes it harder for rogue ships and barges knocking out both bridges in the same accident.

Railway lines in desert areas affected by sand dunes are sometimes built on alternate routes so that if one is covered by sand, the other(s) are still serviceable.

If the standard track centre is changed, it can take a very long time for most or all tracks to be brought into line.

Regulations 
The general standard in Germany and Switzerland had been to build new tracks with a centre-to-centre spacing of 3.80 m and a spacing of 4.50m in railway stations. Depending on the usage of the tracks it was still possible to build new double track lines with track centres of just 3.50 m. With the trains going faster over time the track centres were increased to 4.00 m on main lines.

The advent of high-speed trains required a stronger regulation which was regulated in Germany's EBO. The first update of 1982 increased the minimum track centre to 4.00 m allowing no more exceptions. But by 1991 it was replaced with a table taking into account the maximum speed of the trains on a track as well as the curvature. A distance of 4.00 m was considered enough for speeds up to 200 km/h. At 250 km/h the tracks have a centre-to-centre distance of 4.50 m (while the first tracks in the 1980s were built with a distance of 4.70 m).

The TGV track construction puts both rail tracks into a common concrete block, so they can disregard a safety margin for track displacement. This allows high-speed rail to have a centre-to-centre distance of just 4.20 m. Additionally, these lines are only allowed for high-speed passenger rail where no out-of-gauge loads are expected and the windows in the trains can not be opened.

In Japan, the first high-speed tracks of the Central Japan Railway Company Shinkansen were built with a distance between track centres of 4.3 m.

The largest minimum track centre is planned for Indias high-speed network requiring a common distance of 5,30 m.

Track centre examples 

(put in order of size)

  Liverpool and Manchester Railway 1830 at opening day; later widened.
  United Kingdom (a six-foot plus a four foot)
  New South Wales 1855 old standard (estimated)
Rounded in imperial.
  New South Wales 1973 metric standard; rounded in metric.
  New South Wales Certain ARTC lines after about 2012.
  LGV Rhône-Alpes
  Tōkaidō Shinkansen
  San'yō Shinkansen
  Erfurt–Leipzig/Halle high-speed railway
  Nuremberg–Erfurt high-speed railway (before 1998)

Measurement 

By definition the track spacing is given from center to center of a rail track. For an actual construction the distance is measured from the inside of a rail head to the matching one of the other track. As far as both tracks have the same gauge this is the same distance.

Sharp curves 

Track centre may need to be widened on sharp curves. Gauge may also need to be widened, requiring special sleepers if made of concrete.

Accidents 

If track centres are "narrow" then a problem on one track may affect other track(s).  This is called a "common mode" failure. It affects rail, road, and canals.

River accident damages bridge in both directions.

 In the 2020 Wallan accident, 3 of the four tracks were blocked by the derailed train.
 2021 Ghotki rail crash - second train collides into already derailed train on other track of double track line.

External links 
 Trackopedia
 EOP

References 

Track geometry